Jung Jin-Sun (Hangul: 정진선, Hanja: 鄭鎭善;  or  ; born 24 January 1984) is a South Korean right-handed épée fencer, four-time team Asian champion, four-time individual Asian champion, three-time Olympian, and 2012 individual Olympic bronze medalist.

Career
Jung took up fencing in middle school after being noticed by Olympian Yang Dal-sik.

He made his international debut in the 2004–05 season and won a bronze medal in the Stockholm Grand Prix. A year later, he won gold in team épée at the 2006 Asian Games in Doha.  He then went through a dry spell until he reached the final in the 2008 at the Koweit City World Cup. He climbed on the podium in Montréal and Cali and won the Puerto Rico Grand Prix. In the 2008 Beijing Olympics. He was one of the top seeds for the individual épée competition, but lost 15–11 in the quarter-finals to eventual silver medalist Fabrice Jeannet of France. These results allowed him to finish the season at the second place in world rankings.

In 2011 Jung won the gold medal in the Asian Championships at home in Seoul, a feat he repeated a year later at Wakayama. In the 2012 London Olympics, he knocked out world No.4 Elmir Alimzhanov, then Jörg Fiedler, but was defeated after a tight bout against surprise semifinalist Bartosz Piasecki of Norway. He then met American fencer Weston Kelsey in the bronze medal match. They were tied at 11 all at the end of fencing time. After two double hits, Jung scored with a foot touch to come away with a bronze medal.

After the 2012 Games, Jung won a bronze medal in the 2013 Legnano World Cup. He won the gold medal in the same event a year later, along with a bronze in the Paris World Cup. He won the 2014 Asian Fencing Championships in Suwon after defeating Japan's Keisuke Sakamoto in the final. In the World Championships in Kazan, he made it to the round of 16 but was stopped by Italy's Enrico Garozzo, who eventually won the bronze medal. In the team event, No.6 seed South Korea defeated Brazil, Japan, Ukraine, then host Russia to meet France in the final. After a good start Korea could not prevent a French comeback. They were defeated 39–45 and came away with the silver medal.

Medal Record

Olympic Games

World Championship

Asian Championship

Grand Prix

World Cup

References

External links

1984 births
Living people
People from Hwaseong, Gyeonggi
Fencers from Seoul
South Korean male épée fencers
Fencers at the 2008 Summer Olympics
Fencers at the 2012 Summer Olympics
Fencers at the 2016 Summer Olympics
Olympic fencers of South Korea
Olympic bronze medalists for South Korea
Olympic medalists in fencing
Medalists at the 2012 Summer Olympics
Fencers at the 2006 Asian Games
Fencers at the 2010 Asian Games
Fencers at the 2014 Asian Games
Fencers at the 2018 Asian Games
Asian Games gold medalists for South Korea
Asian Games bronze medalists for South Korea
Asian Games medalists in fencing
Medalists at the 2006 Asian Games
Medalists at the 2010 Asian Games
Medalists at the 2014 Asian Games
Medalists at the 2018 Asian Games